Passage fee is a  donation given by a newly dubbed knight in celebration of his investiture into the knighthood. During the Crusades, passage fees, known as droit de passage, were used to cover the cost of travel to the Holy Land. The passage fee is still present in some modern chivalric orders, such as the Order of the Holy Sepulchre. In the medieval era, the passage fee for the Knights Hospitaller was around 360 Spanish pistoles.

References

Orders of chivalry